Helmut Krauss (11 June 1941 – 26 August 2019) was a German voiceover artist, actor and kabarett artist.

Work 
He provided the German dub voices for Marlon Brando, John Goodman, Yaphet Kotto, Jean Reno, and Samuel L. Jackson.

He also collaborated with the German trance/techno-band E Nomine on a number of their albums.

He voiced Maurice in the German dub of The Penguins of Madagascar and Waternoose in the German dub of Monsters Inc. as well as the Grandfather in the German TV show Heidi.

His best-known acting role was that of Hermann Paschulke, the fuddy-duddy and clumsy, but good-hearted neighbor in the highly successful and long-running German children's TV program Löwenzahn. He played the role for 38 years, from 1981 until shortly before his death in 2019. On 17 May 2020, a special Löwenzahn episode was broadcast that paid homage and said goodbye to him and his role in the show.

Audiobooks (excerpt) 
 2008: Charles Dickens: Eine Weihnachtsgeschichte (A Christmas Carol, Audible only, read by Helmut Krauss)
 2010: Robert Jordan: Drohende Schatten (Book 1 of The Wheel of Time, Audible only, read by Helmut Krauss)
 2013: Craig Lancaster: 600 Stunden aus Edwards Leben (600 Hours of Edward, Audible only, read by Helmut Krauss)
 2014: Craig Lancaster: Edward auf Reisen (Edward Adrift, Audible only, read by Helmut Krauss)
 2016: David Falk: Die letzte Schlacht (Der letzte Krieger 4, Audible only, read by Helmut Krauss)

References

External links 

Official website 
Helmut Krauss at the German Dubbing Card Index

1941 births
2019 deaths
Actors from Augsburg
German cabaret performers
German male actors
German male voice actors
Kabarettists